Jay Diston (born May 10, 1990) is a former Canadian football wide receiver. He participated in training camps with the Hamilton Tiger-Cats in 2011 and 2012 as a territorial exemption before signing with the team on April 15, 2013. Diston played for the Guelph Gryphons in 2010 before going on to play for the Burlington Braves of the CJFL for three years.

References

External links
Just Sports Stats
Hamilton Tiger-Cats bio

1990 births
Canadian Junior Football League players
Canadian football wide receivers
Guelph Gryphons football players
Hamilton Tiger-Cats players
Living people
Players of Canadian football from Ontario
Sportspeople from Niagara Falls, Ontario